Kampung Lintang was one of Simunjan's village. It was believed that Kampung Lintang was beside Kampung Kelka. Kampung Lintang has perished after a horrible soil erosion even though some of its houses still stand to this day. Kampung Lintang is located near District Education Office (Pejabat Pendidikan Daerah - PPD) and Abang Man Primary School (SK Abang Man) with Kampung Kelka as well.

The houses that are still standing are renamed and join the Kampung Kelka but some of the houses' residents still call their place as Kampung Lintang.

References

Villages in Sarawak